David Thomas Fleming (1861–1938) was a member of the New Zealand Legislative Council from 7 May 1918 to 6 May 1925; then 7 May 1925 to 6 May 1932, when his term ended. He was appointed by the Reform Government.

He was from Balclutha.

References 

1861 births
1938 deaths
Members of the New Zealand Legislative Council
Reform Party (New Zealand) MLCs